Anton Johannes Gerrit Corbijn van Willenswaard (born 20 May 1955) is a Dutch photographer, film director and music video director. He is the creative director behind the visual output of Depeche Mode and U2, having handled the principal promotion and sleeve photography for both bands over three decades. Some of his works include music videos for Depeche Mode's "Enjoy the Silence" (1990), U2's "One" (version 1) (1991), Bryan Adams' "Do I Have to Say the Words?", Nirvana's "Heart-Shaped Box" (1993) and Coldplay’s "Talk" (2005) and "Viva la Vida" (2008), as well as the Ian Curtis biographical film Control (2007), The American (2010), A Most Wanted Man (2014), based on John le Carré's 2008 novel of the same name and Life (2015), after the friendship between Life magazine photographer Dennis Stock and James Dean.

Early life and family
Anton Johannes Gerrit Corbijn van Willenswaard was born on 20 May 1955 in Strijen in the Netherlands, where his father had been appointed as parson to the Dutch Reformed Church the previous year. His father, Anton Corbijn van Willenswaard (1917–2007), took up the same position in Hoogland (1966) and Groningen (1972), moving his wife and four children with him. His mother, Marietje Groeneboer (1925–2011), was a nurse and was raised in a parson's family. Photographer and director Maarten Corbijn (born 1960) is a younger brother. Grandfather Anton Johannes (Corbijn) van Willenswaard (1886–1959) was an art teacher at Christian schools in Hilversum and an active member in the local Dutch Reformed Church in Hilversum.

Photography
Corbijn began his career as a music photographer when he saw the Dutch musician Herman Brood playing in a café in Groningen around 1975. He took a lot of photographs of the band Herman Brood & His Wild Romance and these led to a rise in fame for Brood and in exposure for Corbijn.

From the late 1970s the London-based New Musical Express (NME), a weekly music paper, featured his work on a regular basis and would often have a photograph by him on the front page. One such occasion was a portrait of David Bowie wearing a loincloth backstage in New York when starring in The Elephant Man. In the early years of London-based The Face, a glossy monthly post-punk life style / music magazine, Corbijn was a regular contributor. He made his name photographing in black-and-white but in May 1989 he began taking pictures in colour using filters. His first venture in this medium was for Siouxsie Sioux. Between 1998–2000, in collaboration with the painter Marlene Dumas, he worked on a project called "Stripping Girls", which took the strip clubs and peep shows of Amsterdam as their subject; while Corbijn later exhibited photographs, Dumas took Polaroids which she then used as sources for her paintings.

Corbijn has photographed Jimmy Page and Robert Plant (formerly of Led Zeppelin), Bob Dylan, Joy Division, Tom Waits, Bruce Springsteen, Prāta Vētra, Peter Hammill, Miles Davis, Kate Bush, Björk, Captain Beefheart, Kim Wilde, Marc Almond, Robert De Niro, Stephen Hawking, Elvis Costello, Siouxsie and the Banshees, Morrissey, Peter Murphy, Simple Minds, Clint Eastwood, The Cramps, Roxette, Herbert Grönemeyer, Annie Lennox, and Eurythmics, amongst others. Perhaps his most famous and longest standing associations are with Depeche Mode and U2. Corbijn's work relationship with Depeche Mode began with the filming of a music video for their 1986 single "A Question of Time". Corbijn says that he soon "started to realise that [his] visuals and their music went really well together. Then [he] did some live photos, and it eventually turned into designing the whole live set. That's what [he's] been doing for them since 1993." Corbijn has directed 20 of the bands music videos, the most recent of his works being Depeche Mode's 2023 Ghosts Again. He has also designed most of the covers for Depeche Mode's albums and singles from 1990's Violator album and onwards. Corbijn's work with U2 includes taking pictures of the band on their first US tour, taking pictures for their albums The Joshua Tree and Achtung Baby albums (et al.), and directing a number of accompanying videos.

Other album covers featuring work by Corbijn include those for Springsteen, Nick Cave, Siouxsie's second band The Creatures, Bryan Adams, Metallica, Therapy?, The Rolling Stones, Bon Jovi, The Killers, Simple Minds, R.E.M., The Bee Gees, Saybia, Clannad and Moke.

Film directing

Corbijn began his music video directing career when Palais Schaumburg asked him to direct a video. After seeing the resulting video for "Hockey", the band Propaganda had Corbijn direct "Dr. Mabuse". After that he directed videos for David Sylvian, Echo & the Bunnymen, Golden Earring, Front 242, Depeche Mode, Roxette and U2. His first video in colour was made for U2 in 1984 for their single "Pride (In the Name of Love)". In 2005 Palm Pictures released a DVD collection of Corbijn's music video output as part of the Director's Label series.

In 1994 Corbijn directed a short film about Captain Beefheart/Don Van Vliet for the BBC called Some Yoyo Stuff. He made his feature film debut with Control, a film about the life of Joy Division frontman Ian Curtis. It premiered to rave reviews at the Cannes Film Festival on 17 May 2007. The film is based on Deborah Curtis' book Touching from a Distance about her husband and the biography Torn Apart by Lindsay Reade (Tony Wilson's ex-wife) and Mick Middles. Although shown outside the Palme d'Or competition, Control was the big winner of the Director's Fortnight winning the CICAE Art & Essai prize for best film, the "Regards Jeunes" Prize award for best first or second directed feature film and the Europa Cinemas Label prize for best European film in the sidebar. It also received a special mention for the Caméra d'Or prize for best debut feature film. In addition, the film also won the Michael Powell award for best new British feature at the Edinburgh International Film Festival.

In 2010, Corbijn returned as a director with the character-based thriller The American, starring George Clooney.

On 26 October 2011, Corbijn directed a webcast by Coldplay from the Plaza de Toros de Las Ventas in Madrid, Spain.

His film A Most Wanted Man was released in 2014. The John le Carré novel of the same name, which is loosely based on the true War on Terror story of Murat Kurnaz, was set in part in Hamburg, as parts of the film were.

In February 2014, he started filming his next project Life about James Dean and photographer Dennis Stock.

On 23 and 25 July 2018, Corbijn filmed the last two concerts of Depeche Mode's Global Spirit Tour at the Waldbühne in Berlin. Some of this footage, intertwined with the stories of six life-long fans in the audience, became the film Spirits in the Forest, which was released in theaters worldwide on 21 November 2019. In Corbijn's interview with NME he spoke about the origins behind the idea of this film and said that they (him and Depeche Mode) "decided to look at the reason for why Depeche Mode was still growing... they're the biggest cult band in the world. It's unbelievable." He further adds that "it's in the DNA of [Depeche Mode] to have these connection to their fans... there's something unusual about it and the fans go to great lengths", which inspired him to make the film in the style that he did.

Appearances
Author William Gibson refers to a fictitious portrait by Corbijn of the character Hollis Henry in his 2007 novel Spook Country. A Corbijn photograph has served as the author's portrait on many of Gibson's books, including Neuromancer.

Corbijn is the subject of Josh Whiteman's 2009 documentary film Shadow Play – The making of Anton Corbijn.

In May 2011 Corbijn presented Mandela Landscape, an artwork consisting of Corbijn's portrait of Nelson Mandela stitched by Dutch textile artist Berend Strik. Both the original work and 80 signed art prints will be sold to fund the international edition of ZAM Magazine, an independent platform of African talent.

On 19 December 2011, he was announced as being on the jury for the 62nd Berlin International Film Festival, scheduled to be held in February 2012.
At this occasion, the Berlinale Special screened Anton Corbijn – Inside Out, an 80 min-documentary. at the Haus der Berliner Festspiele.

Filmography

Music videos

Films

Bibliography
 Famouz (1989)
 Strangers (1990)
 Allegro (1991)
 Grönemeyer, Photographien von Anton Corbijn (1993)
 Star Trak (1996)
 33 Still Lives (1999)
 Stripping Girls (2000, with Marlene Dumas)
 Werk (2000)
 A. Somebody, Strijen, Holland (2002)
 Everybody Hurts (2003)
 U2 & I (2005)
 In Control (2008). Schirmer/Mosel.
 Inside The American (2010). Schirmer/Mosel .
 Inwards and Onwards. (2011) Schirmer/Mosel .
 Waits/Corbijn '77–'11. (2013). Schirmer/Mosel Verlag .
 Looking at A Most Wanted Man (2014). Mosel Verlag .
 The Making of Miss Dior (2015)
 1-2-3-4 (2015)
 Hollands Deep (2015)
 MOOD/MODE (2020)
 Depeche Mode by Anton Corbijn (2020, limited edition; 2021)

References

External links

Anton Corbijn  at MVDbase.com

Music photographers
1955 births
Depeche Mode
Dutch expatriates in the United Kingdom
Dutch film directors
Dutch music video directors
20th-century Dutch photographers
21st-century Dutch photographers
Living people
People from Strijen
English-language film directors
Dutch contemporary artists
Album-cover and concert-poster artists